The council of the Dr Beyers Naudé Local Municipality is elected every five years by a system of mixed-member proportional representation. Twelve of the twenty-four councillors are elected by first-past-the-post voting from individual wards, while the other twelve are appointed from party lists so that the total number of party representatives is proportional to the number of votes received. By-elections are held to replace the councillors elected by wards if a vacancy occurs.

The Dr Beyers Naudé Local Municipality was created in 2016 by the merger of the Camdeboo, Ikwezi and Baviaans local municipalities. For elections in the predecessor municipalities, see:
 Camdeboo Local Municipality elections
 Ikwezi Local Municipality elections
 Baviaans Local Municipality elections

Results 
The following table shows the composition of the council after past elections.

August 2016 election

At its inaugural election the council consisted of 27 members. The African National Congress obtained a majority of 14 councillors.

By-elections from August 2016 to November 2021
The following by-election was held to fill a vacant ward seat in the period between the elections in August 2016 and November 2021.

November 2021 election

In 2021 the size of the council was reduced to 24 members. No party achieved a majority; a coalition was formed between the Democratic Alliance, the Compatriots of South Africa and the Freedom Front Plus.

References

Dr Beyers Naudé
Elections in the Eastern Cape
Sarah Baartman District Municipality